Solid State Logik is a 2021 two-part digital compilation album by British electronic band The KLF, released to streaming services on KLF Communications, in a series of six official compilations Samplecity thru Trancentral. Part 1 subtitled 7" Hit Singles 1988–1991, released on 1 January 2021 – and part 2, subtitled 12" Master Mixes 1988–2017, released on 23 March 2021. Its first part marked the first time the KLF's music has been commercially available since the band deleted their entire catalog in 1992.

Background 
On 16 January 2013, some albums by the KLF (Chill Out, Space, the original 1997 bootleg of the original version of The White Room, and the Lost Sounds of Mu bootlegs) showed up on streaming platforms, just to turn out unofficial and deleted the next day. In 2018, Billboard mentioned the KLF amongst artists notably absent from major streaming services.

The story surrounding the creation of “Solid State Logik” most likely started around 2017, when two bootleg compilations claiming to be official KLF hit compilations, called “Songs Collection” and “The Works” appeared on streaming services. These were removed in December 2020, several days before the release of Solid State Logik 1.

On 31 December 2020, the release of Solid State Logik 1 (with the title referencing Solid State Logic, a manufacturer of mixing consoles) was announced on a graffiti and posters featuring the KLF logo, hung under a railway bridge on Kingsland Road in Shoreditch, East London. The 30-minute collection of eight remastered and slightly re-edited single versions appeared at midnight 1 January 2021, on music streaming platforms, while high-definition videos were published for the first time on the band's newly established official YouTube channel, marking the first activity of Jimmy Cauty and Bill Drummond as the KLF since 1992.

Solid State Logik 1 includes a previously-unreleased version of "3 a.m. Eternal" with British extreme metal band Extreme Noise Terror, from the abandoned KLF album The Black Room (1990–1992). The song was performed live at the 1992 BRIT Awards, causing controversy by firing blanks from machine guns into the audience.

Further releases 
The Kingsland Road posters also announced further “non-consecutive chapters” of reissues, under the overall title Samplecity thru Trancentral, including a second part of Solid State Logik, along with subsequent collections: Kick-Out D’Jams, Pure Trance Series, Come Down Dawn, and Moody Boys Selected. The material is suggested to feature music released originally under the names: the KLF, the JAMs, the Justified Ancients of Mu Mu, and the Timelords. The posters mentioned outtakes, hinting at the reissues to also feature previously unreleased material.

Track listing

Track 2 is an uncensored version of the 7” radio edit.
Tracks 4 and 7 are new edits.
Track 6 is the USA 7” mix.

Track 1 is a new edit restoring the third verse into a slightly-edited 7” mix.
Track 5 has a different “Jerusalem on the Moors” outro.
Track 7 is incorrectly labelled as the "Make Mine a 99" deep house remix by Tony Thorpe. The mix is actually the extended 12" "Stand by The JAMs" mix.
Track 11 previously unreleased.

References

2021 compilation albums
The KLF albums
KLF Communications compilation albums
Electronic albums by British artists